This is a list of wars and armed conflicts fought by the Kingdom of Spain, its predecessor states or in Spanish territory.

Medieval

Catholic Monarchy

Habsburg Spain

Bourbon Spain

Restoration

Second Spanish Republic

Francoist Spain

Modern

See also 
 Anglo-Spanish War (disambiguation)
 Franco-Spanish War (disambiguation)
 List of Spanish colonial wars in Morocco
 Military history of Spain
 Spanish–Portuguese War (disambiguation)

References 

 
Spanish conquests in the Americas
Spanish military-related lists
Military history of Spain
Spain
Wars